Pasquale De Gregorio is an Italian professional sailor born on 30 April 1941 in Rosciano (in the province of Pescara in Italy).

Biography
A law graduate, he was a lawyer at the Bank of Italy for nearly 20 years. In 1988, at the age of 47, he left his job and career to devote himself entirely to sailing. He has won many regattas and set records. He finished third overall in the Around World Rally, a crewed round-the-world race, at the equator. In 2000, he placed 4th in Europe 1 NewMan Star in Class 2: 50-foot monohulls.

On April 16, 2001, he finished the 2000-2001 Vendée Globe in fifteenth and was the last to successfully complete the course on his boat Wind Telecommunicazioni in 158 day 2 hrs 37 min or 65 days after the winner Michel Desjoyeaux although he was in an IMOCA 50 not 60 like all other finishers.

References

External links

1941 births
Living people
Sportspeople from Pescara
Italian male sailors (sport)
IMOCA 50 class sailors
Italian Vendee Globe sailors
2000 Vendee Globe sailors
Vendée Globe finishers
Single-handed circumnavigating sailors
Rosciano